Dardarkent is a rural locality (a selo) in Koshkentsky Selsoviet, Khivsky District, Republic of Dagestan, Russia. The population was 371 as of 2010. There are 5 streets.

Geography 
Dardarkent is located 20 km southeast of Khiv (the district's administrative centre) by road. Koshkent is the nearest rural locality.

References 

Rural localities in Khivsky District